Look to Your Heart is Perry Como's 16th RCA Victor 12" long-play album.

This album, released shortly after the previous Christmas LP, is one filled with tender ballads and soft standards. Sessions were recorded five months prior at Webster Hall studios in New York where several early Como albums were produced. A number of these selections were first introduced a year earlier on the 1967 NBC Perry Como Holiday Special. It included a recent single, (The) Father of Girls. Work by composers Johnny Mercer, Lerner and Loewe and Rodgers and Hart are highlights in this collection.

The album contained one hit single, "The Father of Girls." It reached #92 on the US Billboard Hot 100 and #10 Easy Listening in the winter of 1968, preceding the release of the LP.

Track listing

Side 1  
"Look to Your Heart" (Music by Jimmy Van Heusen and lyrics by Sammy Cahn)
"My Cup Runneth Over" (Music by Harvey Schmidt and lyrics by Tom Jones)
"Love in a Home"  (Music by Gene De Paul and lyrics by Johnny Mercer)
"In These Crazy Times" (Music by Sidney Lippman and lyrics by Sylvia Dee)
"Try to Remember" (Music by Harvey Schmidt and lyrics by Tom Jones)

Side 2  
"Sunrise, Sunset" (from Fiddler on the Roof) (Music by Jerry Bock and lyrics by Sheldon Harnick)
"How to Handle a Woman" (Music by Frederick Loewe and lyrics by Alan Jay Lerner)
"When You're in Love" (Music by Gene De Paul and lyrics by Johnny Mercer)
"You're Nearer" (Music by Richard Rodgers and lyrics by Lorenz Hart)
"The Father of Girls" (Words and Music by Ervin M. Drake)

References

External links
Perry Como Discography

Perry Como albums
1968 albums
RCA Victor albums